Acarotalpa is a genus of mites in the family Acaridae.

Species
 Acarotalpa duprei Fain, 1987
 Acarotalpa fossor Volgin, 1966

References

Acaridae